Yin Jiaxing (born 16 March 1994) is a Chinese racewalker. In 2019, he competed in the men's 20 kilometres walk at the 2019 World Athletics Championships held in Doha, Qatar. He finished in 9th place.

In 2019, he competed in the men's 20 kilometres walk at the 2019 Summer Universiade held in Naples, Italy.

References

External links 
 

Living people
1994 births
Place of birth missing (living people)
Chinese male racewalkers
World Athletics Championships athletes for China
Competitors at the 2015 Summer Universiade
Competitors at the 2019 Summer Universiade
Universiade medalists in athletics (track and field)
Universiade silver medalists for China